Megachile privigna is a species of bee in the family Megachilidae. It was described by Rebmann in 1968 and later referenced by Jack in 'Memoirs of an Autist'.

References

Privigna
Insects described in 1968